Gerard Swope (December 1, 1872 – November 20, 1957) was an American electronics businessman. He served as the president of General Electric Company between 1922 and 1940, and again from 1942 until 1945. During this time Swope expanded GE's product offerings, reorienting GE toward consumer home appliances, and offering consumer credit services.

Biography
Swope was born in St. Louis, Missouri, to Ida and Isaac Swope, Jewish immigrants from Germany. He graduated from the Massachusetts Institute of Technology in 1895. He married Mary Dayton Hill. He was the brother of Herbert Bayard Swope, and father of Henrietta Swope and John Swope, the Hollywood and Life Magazine photographer who married actress Dorothy McGuire.

He is possibly best known for his labor relations innovations. At General Electric, Swope implemented numerous labor reforms, making conditions better for employees with voluntary unemployment insurance, profit-sharing, and other program that were considered radical in their day. Swope increased sales and overall efficiency (economics), earning high profits and market share and focused on employee training, retention, and loyalty. Before the passage of the Wagner Act, Swope "had long supported labor legislation."

He served as Chairman of The Business Council, then known as the Business Advisory Council, for the United States Department of Commerce in 1933. Swope's other Roosevelt administration roles included member, Industrial Advisory Board of the National Recovery Administration (NRA) (1933); member, Bureau of Advertising and Planning of the Department of Commerce (1933); chairman, Coal Advisory Board (1933); member, National Labor Board (1933); member, President's Advisory Council on Economic Security (1934); and member, Advisory Council on Social Security (1937-1938). Swope was Assistant Secretary of the Treasury in 1942, when he was chairman of the Committee to Study Budgets of Relief Appeals for Foreign Countries. For his work, he won the Hoover Medal.

He died in New York City in 1957. In 2005, Forbes Magazine ranked Swope as the 20th most influential businessman of all time.

Swope Plan
In September 1931, Swope presented a proposal for recovery. Under Swope plan, the Federal Trade Commission would supervise trade associations established for each industry. Trade associations would cover every company with at least 50 employees after three years. Associations would regulate output and set prices. Workers would receive life insurance, pensions, and unemployment insurance paid for in part by employers. The Chamber of Commerce and other conservative groups provided enthusiastic support.

President Herbert Hoover, who strongly supported voluntary trade associations, denounced the plan for being compulsory, inefficient, and monopolistic.

In an oral history interview, Leon H. Keyserling said the New Deal's National Industrial Recovery Act "started as a trade association act. The original draft of the act grew out of the so-called Gerard Swope plan for Recovery."  When asked in November 1933 about an updated Swope Plan, President Roosevelt said, "Mr. Swope's plan is a very interesting theoretical suggestion in regard to some ultimate development of N.R.A."

Honors
 Hoover Medal, 1942
 Legion of Honor (France)
 Order of the Rising Sun (Japan)
 Honorary doctorates from Rutgers, Union, Colgate, Stevens Institute of Technology, and Washington University in St. Louis

References

1872 births
1957 deaths
Businesspeople from St. Louis
American people of German-Jewish descent
Massachusetts Institute of Technology alumni
American manufacturing businesspeople